The  Green Bay Packers season was the franchise's 93rd season overall and their 91st in the National Football League (NFL), and the sixth under head coach Mike McCarthy. The team not only improved on their 10–6 record from a season earlier, they became just the sixth team in NFL history to win 15 games during the regular season. As of 2022, the 15–1 record stands as the best in team history, as well as the best record for a defending Super Bowl champion. The Packers won their first 13 games of the season to extend their winning streak from the previous season to 19, the second-longest in NFL history behind the 21-game winning streak of the New England Patriots in 2003 and 2004, and also tied the record for the best start to a season in NFC history that the New Orleans Saints had set in 2009 (although this would be surpassed by the 2015 Carolina Panthers). The only loss for the Packers during the regular season was a Week 15 defeat in Arrowhead Stadium against the Kansas City Chiefs. They also became the first NFC North team to go undefeated in the division since the 1987 Chicago Bears.

Statistics site Football Outsiders calculated that the Packers were, play for play, the best team in the NFL in 2011 (though they received the second-lowest rating for a number-1 team since the 1993 San Francisco 49ers). According to the site, the Packers' offense was historically prolific, ranking as the second-best pass offense and third-best total offense since they began calculating. Furthermore, quarterback Aaron Rodgers had the fourth-most-prolific season, play by play, since calculations began and some have called it one of the most efficient seasons ever by a quarterback by setting the NFL record for highest passer rating in a season (122.5). The 2011 Packers are one of only five teams in NFL history to score 35 points or more nine times in a single season and one of only two teams to score 42 points or more in at least six games, the other being the 2013 Broncos. The Packers' 70 total touchdowns is currently tied with the 1984 Dolphins for the fourth-most touchdowns scored in a season, and their 51 total touchdown passes are tied with the 2004 Colts for second-most touchdown passes in a season. The defense was ranked last, 32nd, in the league in yards allowed and surrendered an NFL record 4,796 passing yards despite leading the league in interceptions, with 31.

With their record-setting offense, their 15–1 record, and their having home-field advantage throughout the NFC playoffs, the Packers were aiming to repeat as Super Bowl champions and become the first team to win back-to-back titles since the Patriots in 2003 and 2004. However, the Packers instead became the first team to finish with at least 15 victories and not win a playoff game, as they were beaten in a shocking and devastating upset by the eventual Super Bowl champion New York Giants (who had a record of just 9-7) by a score of 37–20 at Lambeau Field during the Divisional round of the playoffs. The Packers became just the sixth team to win 15 games in the regular season, joining the 1984 49ers, 1985 Bears, 1998 Vikings, 2004 Steelers and the 2007 Patriots, who finished the regular season undefeated at 16–0. The Packers became the fourth consecutive team with at least fifteen victories to fail to win the Super Bowl.

Offseason

After finishing the 2010 regular season with a 10–6 record, the Packers went 4–0 in the postseason en route to winning Super Bowl XLV. As a result, the Packers received the final selection (32nd) in the first round of the 2011 NFL draft.

2011 NFL draft

Free agents

Additions
 On July 28, WR Diondre Borel, S Anthony Bratton, G/T Ray Dominguez, WR Tori Gurley, S M. D. Jennings, LB Ricky Elmore, C Sampson Genus, WR Shaky Smithson, FB John Hoese, LB Jamari Lattimore, DE Eli Joseph, LB Vic So'oto, CB Brandian Ross, RB Brandon Saine, and WR Kerry Taylor were signed to a contract as undrafted free agents.
 On July 29, LB Elijah Joseph and NT Chris Donaldson were signed to contract as undrafted free agents.
 On August 3, LB K.C. Asiodu was signed to a contract.
 On September 4, QB Graham Harrell, RB Brandon Saine, WR Diondre Borel, WR Chastin West, G/T Ray Dominguez, CB Brandian Ross, C Sampson Genus and WR Tori Gurley were signed to the practice squad a day after they were all cut from the active roster and cleared waivers.

Departures
 On March 2, LB A. J. Hawk, TE Donald Lee and S Derrick Martin were released. Hawk was re-signed the following day.
 On July 27, LB Nick Barnett, LB Brandon Chillar, DE Justin Harrell, LB Brady Poppinga and T Mark Tauscher were released. S Michael Greco and LB Curtis Young were waived.
 On August 15, LB Diyral Briggs was released.
 On August 28, TE Spencer Havner, WR Brett Swain, and T Theo Sherman were released.
 On August 30, WR Antonio Robinson, LB K.C. Asiodu, and G Adrian Battles were released.
 On September 3, WR Diondre Borel, S Anthony Bratton, T Chris Campbell, G/T Ray Dominguez, NT Chris Donaldson, WR Tori Gurley, S Anthony Levine, LB Ricky Elmore, C Sampson Genus, CB Josh Gordy, QB Graham Harrell, FB Jon Hoese, LB Cardia Jackson, DE Eli Joseph, LB Elijah Joseph, C/G Nick McDonald, RB Dimitri Nance, CB Brandian Ross, NT Jay Ross, RB Brandon Saine, WR Kerry Taylor, WR Chastin West, and S/CB Brandon Underwood were released.
 On September 3, FB Quinn Johnson was traded to the Tennessee Titans for an undisclosed draft pick.
 On September 3, G Caleb Schlauderaff was traded to the New York Jets for an undisclosed draft pick.

Training camp and preseason injuries
 On September 3, DE Lawrence Guy and WR Shaky Smithson were placed on injured reserve.

Coaching changes
 On February 11, Wide receivers coach Jimmy Robinson was signed by the Dallas Cowboys to become their Assistant head coach and wide receivers coach.
 On February 21, Assistant strength and conditioning coach Dave Redding retired.
 On February 22, Zac Woodfin was named Assistant strength and conditioning coach.
 On February 25, Running backs coach Edgar Bennett was moved to Wide receiver coach, Offensive line assistant Jerry Fontenot was promoted to Running backs coach, offensive quality control coach John Rushing was promoted to a combined role of assistant wide receivers coach-special teams coach and hired Joel Hilgenberg as offensive quality control coach.

Final roster

Coaching staff

Regular season

Regular-season transactions
 On September 20, WR Chastin West was signed off the practice squad by the Jacksonville Jaguars.
 On September 21, DE Johnny Jones was signed to the practice squad.
 On October 12, G Ray Dominguez was signed to the active roster from the practice squad and S Nick Collins was placed on injured reserve.
 On October 13, C Cecil Newton was signed to the practice squad.
 On October 31, RB Brandon Saine was signed to the active roster from the practice squad, RB Alex Green was placed on injured reserve, C Cecil Newton was released from the practice squad, and S Anthony Levine and C/G Paul Fenaroli were signed to the practice squad.
 On November 8, T Chris Campbell was signed to the practice squad and C/G Paul Fenaroli was released from the practice squad.
 On December 7, QB Graham Harrell was signed to the active roster from the practice squad, TE Andrew Quarless was placed on injured reserve, and G Jake Vermiglio was signed to the practice squad.
 On December 15, FB Jon Hoese was signed to the practice squad and G Jake Vermiglio was released from the practice squad.
 On December 22, T Herb Taylor was signed and T Derek Sherrod was placed on injured reserve.

Starters on offense

Starters on defense and special teams

Schedule

Preseason

Regular season

Note: Intra-division opponents are in bold text.

Postseason

Standings

Regular-season results

Week 1: vs. New Orleans Saints
NFL Kickoff game

With their Super Bowl XLV championship title to defend, the Green Bay Packers began their 2011 campaign against the previous champion (Super Bowl XLIV champion), the New Orleans Saints in the annual NFL Kickoff Game. Green Bay delivered the game's opening punch in the first quarter as reigning Super Bowl MVP Aaron Rodgers found wide receiver Greg Jennings on a 7-yard touchdown pass, followed by wide receiver Jordy Nelson on a 3-yard touchdown pass. The Saints answered with quarterback Drew Brees completing a 31-yard touchdown pass to wide receiver Robert Meachem, yet the Packers came right back with Rodgers hooking up rookie wide receiver Randall Cobb on a 32-yard touchdown pass. It was Cobb's first career catch as well as touchdown, despite running the wrong route, later revealed by Rodgers. New Orleans crawled their way back in the second quarter as kicker John Kasay got a 30-yard field goal, followed by running back Darren Sproles returning a punt 72 yards for a touchdown. Afterwards, Green Bay struck back with a 17-yard touchdown run from running back James Starks.

The Saints led off the third quarter with Kasay making a 38-yard field goal, yet the Packers' dominating night continued with Cobb returning a kickoff 108 yards for a touchdown. It set a then NFL record for the longest touchdown in NFL history. However, New Orleans continued to hang around with Brees completing a 29-yard touchdown pass to wide receiver Devery Henderson. In the fourth quarter, Green Bay kept imposing their will with a 1-yard touchdown run from fullback John Kuhn. The Saints tried to rally as Brees completed a 5-yard touchdown pass to tight end Jimmy Graham, yet the Packers' defense held on with a goal line stand as time expired to preserve the victory. Aaron Rodgers finished the game completing 27 of 35 pass attempts for 312 yards, 3 touchdown passes, no interceptions, and a passer rating of 132.1.

With the win, Green Bay began their season 1–0 while New Orleans dropped to 0–1 to start their season.

Week 2: at Carolina Panthers

The Green Bay Packers hung on to beat the Carolina Panthers, 30–23, in front of 73,167 at Bank of America Stadium in Charlotte, NC. QB Aaron Rodgers completed 19 of 30 passes for 308 yards and 2 touchdowns, FB John Kuhn rushed for another, and K Mason Crosby converted 3 of 3 field goals (37, 19, 34) in the win for the Packers. The Packers improved to 2–0 on the season in their quest to repeat as Super Bowl Champions. During the win three-time Pro Bowl FS Nick Collins was lost for the season with a neck injury.

Panthers QB Cam Newton threw for 432 yards and a touchdown, and rushed for a score in his second career NFL start. Newton was also intercepted 3 times on the day, 2 times by Packers CB Charles Woodson (who also recovered a fumble for Green Bay defensively). Carolina fell to 0–2 on the season.

Week 3: at Chicago Bears

The Green Bay Packers and Chicago Bears met at Soldier Field for the first time since the 2010 NFC Championship Game earlier this year, when the Packers defeated the Bears 21–14, which allowed Green Bay to advance to and eventually win Super Bowl XLV. This game was much of the same as the defending Super Bowl Champions went into Chicago and left with another 'W', this time 27–17. Packers QB Aaron Rodgers connected with TE Jermichael Finley 3 times on touchdown completions of 6, 7, & 10 yards. Rodgers was crisp and efficient, improving to 6–2 against Chicago in his career. He finished the day completing 28 of 38 passes for 297 yards, 3 touchdowns and an interception. Rodgers leads the NFL in passer rating (120.9) and completion percentage (71.8%) through the first three weeks of the 2011 NFL season. WR Greg Jennings had a solid effort, hauling in a career-high 9 receptions for 119 yards and the aforementioned Finley caught 7 passes for 85 yards to go along with his 3 touchdowns. RB Ryan Grant showed flashes of his 2009 form prior to a season-ending ankle injury in 2010. He rushed the ball 17 times for 92 yards, a 5.4 per carry average. For Chicago, QB Jay Cutler had another up and down game against Green Bay. He completed 21 of 37 passes for 302 yards and 2 touchdowns, but threw 2 costly interceptions to Packers SS Morgan Burnett. Bears standout RB Matt Forte was held in check all day as he was only able to gain 2 yards on 9 carries.

Green Bay remained undefeated at 3–0 with the win. With the loss, Chicago dropped to 1–2 on the early season and 2 games behind both division leaders, Green Bay and Detroit.

Week 4: vs. Denver Broncos

The Green Bay Packers returned to Lambeau Field for the first time since their victory in the NFL opening kickoff game on September 8 and continued their early season success by defeating the visiting Denver Broncos, 49–23. The Packers jumped out to an early lead, as they led 21–3 with 12:18 remaining in the 2nd quarter. The Broncos countered with two straight touchdowns to cut the Packer lead to 21–17, but the Packers responded by scoring 28 unanswered points to win in blowout fashion. Packers QB Aaron Rodgers had a career day, completing 29 of 38 (76.3%) passes for a career-high 408 yards. He threw 4 touchdowns (one to each WR Jordy Nelson, WR Greg Jennings, WR James Jones, and WR Donald Driver) and an interception. Rodgers showed his versatility by rushing for scores of 11 and 8 yards as well. He became the only QB in NFL history to record at least 400 yards passing, with 4 touchdown passes, and 2 rushing touchdowns in one game. WR Greg Jennings caught 7 passes for 103 yards to go along with his touchdown and RB James starked added 63 yards rushing and 38 yards receiving. On defense, the Packers forced 4 turnovers (3 INT and 1 FF), most notably an interception by CB Charles Woodson in the first quarter returned 30 yards for a touchdown. Broncos QB Kyle Orton threw for 273 yards, 3 touchdowns, and 3 interceptions in the loss. This was the first-ever regular season game to end with a score of 49 to 23.

The loss dropped Denver to 1–3. They return home to take on AFC West-leading San Diego next Sunday. Green Bay (4–0) remained 1 of 2 unbeaten teams (Detroit) through the first 4 weeks of the 2011 NFL season. The Packers go on the road next week to take on the Atlanta Falcons on primetime, Sunday Night Football. It will be a rematch of an NFC Divisional game from the 2010–11 NFL Playoffs, a game won 48–21 by Green Bay en route to winning Super Bowl XLV.

Week 5: at Atlanta Falcons

The Green Bay Packers beat the Atlanta Falcons, 25–14, in a matchup at the Georgia Dome in Atlanta, GA in the NFL week 5 edition of Sunday Night Football. The Falcons received the opening kickoff and took the ball 80 yards in just under 7 minutes to jump out to an early 7–0 lead on a QB Matt Ryan to WR Roddy White touchdown connection. On the ensuing possession, Green Bay drove into Atlanta territory but Atlanta CB Brent Grimes forced a fumble from Green Bay RB Ryan Grant. The Falcons once again took the ball down the field for a touchdown, this time on a RB Michael Turner 1-yard run, and with just over 12 minutes remaining in the second quarter, Atlanta led 14–0. Green Bay cut the lead to 14–6 at the half on a pair of second-quarter field goals by K Mason Crosby. In the second half it was all about the Green Bay defense which posted a shutout in the final 42 minutes of the game. Midway through the third quarter, Crosby boomed a 56 yarder to cut it to 14–9. Then after a stand by the Packer defense, Packers QB Aaron Rodgers hooked up with WR James Jones on a 70-yard touchdown that put the Packers ahead for good 15–14 (failed 2-pt conv.). On the first play of the fourth quarter Rodgers went to work again and hooked up with WR Greg Jennings on a 29-yard touchdown and Crosby added his fourth field goal with 1:10 remaining to seal it for the visiting Packers.

Green Bay QB Aaron Rodgers completed 26 of 39 passes for 396 yards and 2 TD's to lead the offense and remain the early season favorite for MVP. Atlanta QB Matt Ryan struggled, completing 18 of 32 passes for 167 yards, with a TD and 2 INT (by S Charlie Peprah & CB Jarrett Bush). With the win, Green Bay improved to 5–0 as the defending Super Bowl Champions went to Atlanta and dealt them another defeat at home. This coming off a decisive 48–21 Green Bay victory in last years NFC divisional round, also in Atlanta. The Falcons drop to 2–3 with the loss and host the Carolina Panthers next Sunday. Green Bay returns to Lambeau Field to take on the winless St. Louis Rams.

Week 6: vs. St. Louis Rams

The Green Bay Packers remained undefeated as they beat the St. Louis Rams, 24–3, in front of 70,604 at Lambeau Field in Green Bay, Wisconsin. All of the scoring took place in the first half. Packers K Mason Crosby kicked off the scoring in the first quarter with 32-yard FG. Then the second quarter was all Green Bay on the right arm of QB Aaron Rodgers. Rodgers connected on TD passes to James Jones (35 yards), Jordy Nelson (93 yards), and Donald Driver (7 yards) to lead Green Bay to a 24–0 lead that they never relinquished. Rams K Josh Brown made a 36-yard FG just seconds before halftime but St. Louis couldn't inch any closer as the second half was highlighted by a defensive struggle on both sides.

Rodgers finished the day with 3 TD and an INT on 18/29 passing for 316 yards. This was Rodgers' fifth 300+ yard game in six contests in 2011. Rams QB Sam Bradford finished with 328 yards passing with an INT but couldn't find the end zone for the winless Rams (0–5). They travel to Dallas next Sunday, still looking for win no. 1 in 2011. Green Bay improves to 6–0 and head to Minnesota for a divisional matchup with the 4th-place Vikings next Sunday.
Also with the Lions' loss, the Packers remain the NFL's only undefeated team.

Week 7: at Minnesota Vikings

The Green Bay Packers knocked off division-rival Minnesota, in a hard fought battle at the Metrodome, 33–27. The Vikings turned to rookie QB Christian Ponder to try to turn things around in a move sending veteran QB Donovan McNabb to the bench, who had been struggling the first six games of the season (Minnesota was 1–5 coming in). Minnesota started fast as Ponder threw his first career NFL touchdown pass to Visanthe Shiancoe just 56 seconds into the game. On the ensuing possession, Green Bay QB Aaron Rodgers went right to work and navigated the Packer offense down the field on a touchdown drive that ended on a 2-yard TD pass from Rodgers to FB John Kuhn. Vikings Standout RB Adrian Peterson scored early in the second quarter and had a big day (175 yards on 24 rushes). K Mason Crosby added a pair of field goals for GB, and K Ryan Longwell added one himself and Minnesota headed to the locker room with a 17–13 lead. But the second half was a different story as Green Bay flexed their muscle. On the second play of the third quarter, Rodgers found WR Greg Jennings for a 79-yard TD, and shortly after Rodgers hooked up with TE Jermichael Finley for a 2-yard score. Crosby booted 2 more field goals (one of which for a franchise record 58 yards), which were sandwiched around 2 interceptions by Packers CB Charles Woodson, and GB led 33–17 after three-quarters. Minnesota cut the lead to 33–27 late in the fourth quarter on another Longwell field goal and Ponder to WR Michael Jenkins TD pass, but Green Bay was able to keep the lead and run out the clock with strong running by RB James Starks in the closing minutes.

Rodgers ended the day, completing 24 of 30 passes (including 13 for 13 to start the game), for 335 yards and 3 touchdowns, and now has an incredible league-leading 125.7 passer rating and 20 touchdown passes through the first 7 weeks. The Packers remained the only undefeated in the NFL at 7–0 heading into their bye week, and will play at San Diego following the bye. Minnesota falls to 1–6 and head to Carolina next Sunday.

Week 9: at San Diego Chargers

The Green Bay Packers won a shootout with the San Diego Chargers, 45–38, at Qualcomm Stadium in San Diego, CA. San Diego received the opening kickoff and QB Philip Rivers navigated the Chargers down the field and found WR Vincent Jackson for a 23-yard touchdown early in the first quarter. Then Packers QB Aaron Rodgers took the field and did the same finishing the 8 play, 63-yard drive with a 5-yard touchdown pass to TE Jermichael Finley to tie the score 7–7. Then the Green Bay defense went to work. On consecutive drives the Packer defense picked off Rivers and returned it for touchdowns, the first a 40 yarder by SS Charlie Peprah and the latter, a 43 yarder by CB Tramon Williams. In the blink of an eye, it was 21–7 Green Bay. San Diego answered with another touchdown drive of their own completed by RB Michael Tolbert 8-yard run. San Diego K Nick Novak booted a 52-yard FG to cut the GB lead to 4 but Rodgers hooked up with WR Jordy Nelson for a 16-yard score just 18 seconds before halftime and took a 28–17 lead into the locker room. The second half got under way and Green Bay navigated its way down the field and K Mason Crosby converted a 47-yard FG to remain a perfect 15–15 on the season. Rivers threw his second touchdown of the game to TE Antonio Gates late in the third quarter to cut the Packer lead to 31–24. Green Bay appeared to put the game out of reach early in the fourth quarter when Rodgers threw touchdown passes to WR James Jones and WR Greg Jennings, as the Packers led by 21. But San Diego once again stormed back when Jackson caught his second touchdown of the day which was followed by a San Diego onside kick and recovery. San Diego wasted no time as under a minute later Rivers found Jackson for the third time and suddenly it was 45–38 with over six minutes to play. That was the final score as the Packers Charlie Peprah made his second interception to seal the victory for Green Bay.

Rodgers finished the day 21/26 for 247 yards with 4 touchdowns and no interceptions for Green Bay. Rivers finished 26/46 for 385 yards with 4 touchdowns but 3 big interceptions for San Diego. With the win Green Bay improves to 8–0 at the midway of the season and host division rival Minnesota next Monday on Monday Night Football at Lambeau Field. San Diego falls to 4–4 and have a quick turnaround as they host Oakland on Thursday in the 2011 first edition of NFL Network's Thursday Night Football.

Week 10: vs. Minnesota Vikings

The Packers stayed undefeated after a crushing victory over the Vikings. Just 1:18 into the game Randall Cobb managed to make a punt-return TD over 80 yards to give the Packers the lead. The Vikings managed just 1 first down before the Packers defense forced them into another punt, Aaron Rodgers & co. took advantage of it and the lead went up to 14. 1:18 before the end of the first quarter the Vikings kicker Ryan Longwell missed a 52-yd field goal. The second quarter started the way the first went with a Packers score, Mason Crosby connected on a 25-yd FG. No more scoring happened in this half, Tramon Williams successfully intercepted a pass by Ponder, making it only the second highlight that quarter. The Vikings were shut down by the Packers defense by managing not to score the whole first half. At the start of the third quarter Rodgers found Jordy Nelson for a 17-yd TD pass to push the lead to 24–0. Later on, Adrian Peterson scored a TD after a 3-yd run to give Minnesota the only points in the game. The rest of the way was a one-sided affair, with the Packers scoring another three touchdowns. John Kuhn and Nelson for the second time gave Rodgers two more TD passes in this game. Rodgers watched the last 10:30 of the game from the bench, looking at his backup Matt Flynn, who did score a 3-yd run TD 4:33 before the end of the game.

With this win the Packers went to 9–0 sweeping the Vikings in the season and dropping the Vikings to 2–7. Rodgers again had a good passing game with connecting on 23 of his 30 pass attempts. Nelson was next to Rodgers the player of the game with his two touchdowns. The Packers will now play home to the Tampa Bay Buccaneers, while the Vikings play at home against Oakland.

Week 11: vs. Tampa Bay Buccaneers

The Packers took on the Buccaneers and managed to get the 10th victory of the season. B. J. Raji opened the scoring three minutes before the end of the first quarter, Mason Crosby completed the XP to give the Packers the 7–0 lead after one. Tom Crabtree received a 5-yd TD pass from Aaron Rodgers that blew the lead to 14, before LeGarrette Blount ran 54 yards to slice the lead to seven. Later on Connor Barth successfully connected on a 23-yd FG and the lead was just four, but two minutes before the end of the half Jordy Nelson got a 5-yd pass for a TD and the lead at the half was 21–10. The third quarter was less action and scoring, only Barth hit a 32-yd FG to make it an eight-point game. Mike Williams made it even a two-point game with an early TD in the fourth, but Tampa tried a two-point conversion to tie the game, but Kellen Winslow II dropped the ball after he originally caught it. Tampa had three penalties of Pass interferences in a short time of period and the whole momentum went back to the Packers and John Kuhn made a 2-yd run for a TD. Tampa were not done yet, 4:31 before the end, Dezmon Briscoe closed the lead once again to two. But Nelson decided the game with his second touchdown of the evening.

Week 12: at Detroit Lions
Thanksgiving Day game

Coming off their home win over the Buccaneers, the Packers flew to Ford Field for a Week 12 Thanksgiving duel with their NFC North foe, the Detroit Lions. After a scoreless first quarter, Green Bay delivered the game's opening punch in the second quarter with quarterback Aaron Rodgers finding wide receiver Greg Jennings on a 3-yard touchdown pass.

The Packers added to their lead in the third quarter with a 1-yard touchdown run from fullback John Kuhn, followed by Rodgers connecting with wide receiver James Jones on a 65-yard touchdown pass and a 35-yard field goal from kicker Mason Crosby. The Lions answered in the fourth quarter with a 16-yard touchdown run by running back Keiland Williams and a two-point conversion pass from quarterback Matthew Stafford to wide receiver Titus Young), yet Green Bay pulled away with Crosby nailing a 32-yard field goal. Detroit closed out the game with Stafford completing a 3-yard touchdown pass to wide receiver Calvin Johnson.

With the win, the Packers acquired their first 11–0 start in franchise history, beating the 1962 team which started 10–0 and finished 14–1 including postseason play.

Rodgers (22/32 for 307 yards, 2 TDs) was named NFL on FOX's 2011 Galloping Gobbler Award Winner.

Week 13: at New York Giants

Mason Crosby made a game-winning field goal the last 3 seconds of the game as the Packers improved to 12–0. The team later clinched the NFC North division title with the Detroit Lions' 31–17 loss to the New Orleans Saints.

Week 14: vs. Oakland Raiders

With the win, the Packers improved to 13–0 for the first time in franchise history.

Week 15: at Kansas City Chiefs

In one of the biggest upsets of the year, the Kansas City Chiefs beat the heavily favored Packers. It was also Aaron Rodgers first game of the season where he did not throw for multiple touchdowns.  Kyle Orton was the quarterback after he was traded from the Denver Broncos.

With the loss, the Packers fell to 13–1, ending their hopes of a perfect season.

Week 16: vs. Chicago Bears
Christmas Day

Week 17: vs. Detroit Lions

With the win, the Packers would finish their season at 15–1 and also sweep the Lions for the first time since 2009. They also swept the NFC North for the first time ever since the NFL created divisions in 1967.   This is also the highest-scoring game between the Lions and the Packers in the history of the rivalry between both teams with a combined total of 86 points. Aaron Rodgers, Charles Woodson, Greg Jennings, and Clay Matthews were put as inactive, after already securing the bye week, to avoid injury.

During the game, Brad Jones restrained a 15 year old fan who ran onto the field.

Postseason (Playoffs)

NFC Divisional Round: vs. New York Giants

Eli Manning threw three touchdowns, which proved to be instrumental in the Giants victory, thus dethroning the Packers from their World Championship as their overall record stumbled to 15–2.

The Packers recorded a season high nine dropped passes. They also recorded a season high four turnovers in the game.
The coaching staff of the Packers, in particular head coach Mike McCarthy raved of the Packers precise practice performance in the week leading up to the playoff game. The reason for the inefficient offensive performance from one of the league's most historically prolific offensive units is unknown, though the Packers' decision to rest their starters may have been costly to their players, as doing so tends to put players "out of rhythm". Another contributing factor was possibly the disappearance and death of Michael Philbin, Offensive Coordinator Joe Philbin's son, five days before. Quarterback Aaron Rodgers went a full three weeks without taking the field, and the offense dropped several crucial passes. The 2009 Indianapolis Colts rested their starters after starting 14-0 and ultimately lost Super Bowl XLIV.  The Packers also became the 3rd team to finish the regular season 15–1 and not reach the Super Bowl, and the first to not win a single playoff game.

Also, the Giants handed the Packers their second loss and first home loss of the season. The Packers would also be the second team with a 13-game winning streak to fail to win a playoff game, after the 2005 Colts.

Statistics

Regular season statistical leaders

 stats values are correct through Week 17.

Best game performances

 stats are correct through Week 17.

Statistical league rankings
 Total Offense (YPG): 3rd
 Passing (YPG): 3rd
 Rushing (YPG): 27th
 Points (PPG): 1st
 Total Defense (YPG): 32nd
 Passing (YPG): 32nd
 Rushing (YPG): 14th
 Points (PPG): 19th
Stats correct through week 17.

Awards and records

Awards

Weekly awards
 QB Aaron Rodgers was named NFC Offensive Player of the Week for games played on Week 1. (vs. Saints)
 WR Randall Cobb was named NFL's Pepsi Rookie of the Week for games played on Week 1. (vs. Saints)
 OLB Clay Matthews was named GMC Never Say Never Moment of the Week for his contributions to the goal line stand on Week 1. (vs. Saints)
 QB Aaron Rodgers was named FedEx Air Player of the Week for games played on Week 4. (vs. Broncos)
 QB Aaron Rodgers was named NFC Offensive Player of the Week for games played on Week 5. (vs. Falcons)
 QB Aaron Rodgers was named FedEx Air Player of the Week for games played on Week 5. (vs. Falcons)
 K Mason Crosby was named NFC Special Teams Player of the Week for games played on Week 5. (vs. Falcons)
 QB Aaron Rodgers was named FedEx Air Player of the Week for games played on Week 6. (vs. Rams)
 K Mason Crosby was named NFC Special Teams Player of the Week for games played on Week 7. (vs. Vikings)
 QB Aaron Rodgers was named FedEx Air Player of the Week for games played on Week 7. (vs. Vikings)
 QB Aaron Rodgers was named NFC Offensive Player of the Week for games played on Week 9. (vs. Chargers)
 QB Aaron Rodgers was named FedEx Air Player of the Week for games played on Week 9. (vs. Chargers)
 QB Aaron Rodgers was named FedEx Air Player of the Week for games played on Week 13. (vs. Giants)
 QB Aaron Rodgers was named GMC Never Say Never Moment of the Week for his contributions to the game-winning drive on Week 13. (vs. Giants)
 P Tim Masthay was named NFC Special Teams Player of the Week for games played on Week 13. (vs. Giants)
 QB Matt Flynn was named NFC Offensive Player of the Week for games played on Week 17. (vs. Lions)
 QB Matt Flynn was named FedEx Air Player of the Week for games played on Week 17. (vs. Lions)
 QB Matt Flynn was named GMC Never Say Never Moment of the Week for his contributions to his record setting performance in relief of Aaron Rodgers on Week 17. (vs. Lions)

Monthly awards
 QB Aaron Rodgers was named NFC Offensive Player of the Month for the month of September.
 QB Aaron Rodgers was named NFC Offensive Player of the Month for the month of October.
 QB Aaron Rodgers was named NFC Offensive Player of the Month for the month of November.

Annual awards
 QB Aaron Rodgers was named AP Male Athlete of the Year(2011).
 QB Aaron Rodgers was named AP Most Valuable Player

Records

Team

Game

Season
 Packers record for Most consecutive games Won with 19 (Wk 15 2010 – Wk 14 2011) passing the previous best marks of 11 in 1928–29 and 1961–62.
 Packers record for Most consecutive games won, season with 13 (Wk 1 – Wk 14) passing the previous best mark of 10 in 1929 and 1962.
 Packers record for Most Games won, regular season with 15 passing the previous best mark of 13 in 1962, 1996, 1997 and 2007.
 Packers record for Most consecutive games won, start of season with 13 passing the previous best mark of 10 in 1929 and 1962.
 Packers record for Most consecutive games without defeat, season with 13 (13 wins, 0 ties) passing the previous best mark of 13 (12 wins, 1 tie) in 1929.
 Packers record for Most consecutive games without defeat, start of season with 13 (13 wins, 0 ties) passing the previous best mark of 13 (12 wins, 1 tie) in 1929.
 Packers record for Most Points, season with 560 points passing the previous best mark of 461 in 2009.
 Packers record for Most overall touchdowns, season with 70 passing the previous best mark of 56 in 1996.
 Packers record for Most touchdown passes, season with 51 passing the previous record of 39 in 1996.
 Packers record for Most yards gained, season with 6,482 yards passing the previous best mark of 6,357 in 2004.

Individual

Game
 QB Aaron Rodgers became the first quarterback in NFL history to post 400 yards passing, four passing touchdowns and two rushing touchdowns in a game against the Denver Broncos on October 2, 2011.
 QB Matt Flynn Broke the Packers record of Most touchdown passes, game with 6 vs the Detroit Lions January 1, 2012. The Previous record holders were Cecil Bell, Don Horn, Lynn Dickey, Brett Favre, and Aaron Rodgers.
 QB Matt Flynn Broke the Packers Record of Most passing yards, game with 480 Yards vs the Detroit Lions on January 1, 2012. The previous record holder was Aaron Rodgers.
 K Mason Crosby successfully converted a team record 58-yard field goal against the Minnesota Vikings on October 23, 2011. The previous record was 56, set by Crosby himself.

Season
 QB Aaron Rodgers Set the Packers record for Single-season passer rating with a rating of 122.5. Bart Starr had the previous best with a rating of 105.0.
 QB Aaron Rodgers Set the NFL record for Single-season passer rating with a rating of 122.5. Peyton Manning had the previous best with a rating of 121.1.
 QB Aaron Rodgers Set the Packers record for Highest completion percentage, season (140 attempts) with 68.3%. Brett Favre had the previous best percentage with 66.54%.
 QB Aaron Rodgers Set the Packers record for Most touchdown passes, season with 45. Brett Favre had the previous best mark with 39.
 QB Aaron Rodgers Set the Packers record for Most yards passing, season with 4,643. Lynn Dickey had the previous best mark with 4,458 yards.
 QB Aaron Rodgers Set the Packers record for Most games, 300 or more yards passing, season with 8. Brett Favre had the previous best mark with 7.
 QB Aaron Rodgers Set the Packers record for Most consecutive games, 300 or More Yards Passing with 4 (Wk's 4–7). Lynn Dickey and Brett Favre both had the previous best with 3 each.
 QB Aaron Rodgers Tied the Packers record for Most consecutive games, Four or More Touchdown Passes with Brett Favre with 2.
 QB Aaron Rodgers Tied the Packers record for Highest average gain, season (200 attempts) with Lynn Dickey at 9.2.
 WR Randall Cobb Set the Packers record for Most Kickoff Return Yards, Rookie, season passing Charles Wilson who had 798 yards in 1990.
 K Mason Crosby Set the Packers record for Most (Kicking) PAT attempted, season with 69 passing Chris Jacke's best mark of 53.
 K Mason Crosby Set the Packers record for Most (one-point) points after touchdown, season with 68 passing Jan Stenerud's best mark of 52.
 P Tim Masthay Set the Packers record for Highest gross average, punting, season (35 punts) with 45.6 passing Craig Hentrich's best gross average of 45.0.

Career
 Donald Driver set the Packers record for Career receiving yards in week 2 vs the Carolina Panthers. Passing James Lofton previous best mark of 9,656.

2012 Pro Bowl selections

Notes and references

External links
 2011 Green Bay Packers season at ESPN

Green Bay
NFC North championship seasons
Green Bay Packers seasons
Green Bay Packers